= Pediatric Dermatology =

- Discipline: Dermatology
- Language: English

Publication details
- Publisher: Wiley
- Impact factor: 1.997 (2020)

Standard abbreviations
- ISO 4: Pediatr. Dermatol.

Indexing
- ISSN: 1525-1470

Links
- Journal homepage; Online archive

Pediatric Dermatology is a peer-reviewed medical journal provide relevant and educational material for practising clinicians and dermatological researchers, focused on hemangiomas, atopic dermatitis, neonatal medicine etc. The journal is published by Wiley.

== Abstracting and indexing ==
The journal is abstracted and indexed in:

- Abstracts in Anthropology (Sage)
- Abstracts on Hygiene & Communicable Diseases (CABI)
- Academic Search (EBSCO Publishing)
- Academic Search Alumni Edition (EBSCO Publishing)
- Academic Search Premier (EBSCO Publishing)
- AgBiotech News & Information (CABI)
- AgBiotechNet (CABI)

According to the Journal Citation Reports, the journal has a 2020 impact factor of 1.997.
